Jeter Andrew Barker Jr. (July 4, 1924 – July 11, 2011) was a philanthropist and the creator, founder, and former mayor of the cowboy themed town of Love Valley, North Carolina in Iredell County.

Early life
Barker was born in Mecklenburg County, North Carolina on July 4, 1924.  As a child growing up in Mecklenburg County, North Carolina, he wanted to be a cowboy.  His teachers told him that there were no cowboy towns in North Carolina. When he was older, he and his father (Jeter Andrew Barker, I) ran a lucrative construction company, JA Construction, in Charlotte.  He was a military veteran of the Army Corps of Engineers in World War II.  He attempted to run for governor of North Carolina in the Democratic primary on two occasions (1976 and 1984) and for the Senate once.

Love Valley
His wife Ellenora Spratt Barker, daughter Tonda (age six), and son Jeter Andrew "Jet" Barker III (age two) moved to a little one-room shack in North Iredell County in April 1954.  There, he fulfilled his childhood dream when he built and founded the town of Love Valley in 1954 as a cowboy themed town.  Love Valley was incorporated in 1963.  In 1970, Love Valley hosted a rock festival in which the Allman Brothers Band played. In the late 1990s, the Love Valley Horseman's Association and Love Valley Mule Association were formed.  These associations are responsible for many of the events that take place in Love Valley.

Death
At the time of his death on July 11, 2011, Barker was mayor of Love Valley for all but six of the town's 48 years of incorporation. His father of the same name (went by A.J. Barker) was Love Valley's first mayor. Two other men had one-term stints as the top elected official during periods when Barker was retired. He was one of the longest serving mayors in the United States.  Barker and his wife, who died in 2018, were buried at the Love Valley Presbyterian Church Cemetery, which he built in Love Valley as the first structure in town.

Honors
Barker received several awards:
 Cowboy Hall of Fame
 Southeastern Rodeo Hall of Fame
 Marquis Who's Who of America
 Mayors Hall of Fame, 1994

See also
 1976 North Carolina gubernatorial election
 1984 North Carolina gubernatorial election

References

People from Iredell County, North Carolina
Mayors of places in North Carolina
1924 births
2011 deaths
United States Army personnel of World War II